Anna Maria Mendieta is a professional harpist from the United States best known for pioneering the harp as a contemporary tango instrument. She is the founder, artistic director, and harpist for Tango del Cielo, an award-winning album and international touring show.

Career
Anna Maria is the principal harpist with the Sacramento Philharmonic & Opera and previously served as the principal harpist with the Women’s Philharmonic for nearly 20 years. Ms. Mendieta was the featured instrumentalist for several seasons with Theater Flamenco of San Francisco.
She has also performed with symphony orchestras in the U.S. and abroad, including the San Francisco Symphony, San Francisco Opera, San Francisco Ballet, Russian National Orchestra, and Russian State Ballet. 
Mendieta has received international recognition in 2007 as a pioneer and "exceptional soloist" (League of American Orchestras) for becoming the first harpist to play the first Argentine tango concerto ever written.

Innovations in tango

Mendieta has been recognized internationally as an innovator in the world of harp and has helped create a new genre for the instrument. Mendieta considered the harp a perfect vehicle for tango, and has since spent years advocating for the form. It was since the 1990’s that Mendieta became fascinated with Argentine Tango but quickly discovered that there was no music for the harp. Argentine tradition set apart “classical” instruments like the harp from the genre (the only use of the harp was for glissando sound effects in the 1930s). After many years of collecting tango music written for other instruments, she created her own arrangements and invented a new technique, one that allowed the hard to execute the stylistic nature, difficult chromatic passages, and percussive effects that characterize tango music. She was introduced to close friends and colleagues of the late tango composer Astor Piazzolla. Piazzolla had created Nuevo Tango (a sub-genre that combined tango with jazz and modern classical), so by working with Piazzolla’s closest colleagues and artistic collaborators, Mendieta has created a new vision for tango and harp.

Mendieta studied tango (the dance) and quickly realized her passion for both art forms. Mendieta's “Harp-Tango” project has developed into a multimedia touring concert-show called “Tango Del Cielo”. The show presents a fusion of tango and flamenco with a tribute to the silent films. Mendieta’s Tango Del Cielo show was the featured show at the 2019 World Tango Festival in Victoria, Canada.

The Tango Del Cielo for Harp & Orchestra has won 9 international awards, including 4 Global Music Awards, reached #2 on Billboard’s Classical Crossover Charts.

Early life and education

Mendieta was born and raised in San Francisco, California, to a Spanish and Latin American family. Her parents played a number of musical instruments and encouraged their seven children to learn an instrument at a young age to study music, art, and dance. She first played the harp at the age of seven, when she began studying the Salzedo method at the San Francisco Conservatory of Music under the tutelage of popular Israeli harpist Efrat Zaklad.

She continued her studies at San Francisco State University and at Stanford University with Marjorie Chauvel and graduated with honors from Notre Dame de Namur University with a Bachelor's Degree in music. She has also studied privately with the San Francisco Symphony’s principal harpist Doug Rioth and with world-renowned harpist Alice Chalifoux at the Salzedo Harp Colony in Camden, Maine.

Awards and honors

Global Music Awards - Anna Maria Mendieta - Tango Del Cielo Album
2022 Bronze Medal for Best Music Video "Oblivion" (with filmmaker Cristian Pablo Ardito, Libres Del Mundo Productions) 
2021 Silver Medalist for Best Album “Tango Del Cielo”
2021 Silver Medal - Best Instrumentalist
2021 Silver Medal - Editing & Mixing “Tango Del Cielo” Album

Clouzine International Music Awards
2022 - Best Music Video “Oblivion” (with filmmaker Cristian Pablo Ardito, Libres Del Mundo Productions)
2020 Best Classical Crossover Album - “Tango Del Cielo” Album
2020 Best Music Video “Libertango” (Libres Del Mundo Productions)

LIT International Talent Awards
2021 Most Artistic Music Video “Oblivion”
2021 Best Show “Tango Del Cielo”

2013 American Harp Society Grant Commission recipient for a concerto to be composed for her.

Mendieta is the only harpist to have twice received the “Matz Memorial Award” from Lyon & Healy Harp Company for “Outstanding Achievement”.

Notable performances

Played for:

 President Bill Clinton 
 President Mikhail Gorbachev  
 King Juan Carlos and Queen Sophia of Spain 
 NFL 2022 Super Bowl VIP Pre-game Event 
 George Lucas 
 Pope Benedict XV 
 Colin Powell 
 George Shultz  
 Francis Ford Coppola 
 Lindsay Wagner 
 Featured instrumentalist - Theater Flamenco of San Francisco 
 2006 American Harp Society National Harp Conference. 
 National Hispanic Week in Washington D.C. 
 Spoleto Festival 
 The Central Intelligence Agency

Celebrity Concert Performances:

 Andrea Bocelli  
 Josh Groban 
 Frank Sinatra Jr. 
 Olivia Newton-John 
 Fernando de la Mora 
 Barry Manilow 
 Johnny Mathis 
 Moody Blues 
 Frederica Von Stade  
 John Denver 
 Charlotte Church

Discography

Also featured on:
“Around the World” National Geographic Music Series – “Serenity, Songs of Peace and Enlightenment” (National Geographic & Sugo Music Label)
Musae - Women’s Ensemble “Songs of the Southwest” 
Pacific Boy Choir - “O Holy Night” (2012)
Rejoice! - The Young Women’s Chorus of San Francisco (2016)
Titanes Del Trombones - Doug Beavers, Trombone (2018 Grammy Winner)

References

External links
Official site

American harpists
Tango musicians
Living people
Year of birth missing (living people)
Stanford University alumni
Place of birth missing (living people)
Women harpists